Adil-Yangiyurt (Adil-yangı-yurt) is a rural locality (a selo) and the administrative centre of Adil-Yangiyurtovsky Selsoviet, Babayurtovsky District, Republic of Dagestan, Russia. The population was 3,864 as of 2010. There are 39 streets. Selo was founded in 1857.

Geography
Adil-Yangiyurt is located 16 km southwest of Babayurt (the district's administrative centre) by road. Chankayurt is the nearest rural locality.

References 

Rural localities in Babayurtovsky District